Pakkiri Rajagopal is a Republican from Hamilton County, Ohio who was a presidential elector in 2000.

Rajagopal was born in Pollal not far from Madras.  He graduated from Madras University and then immigrated to the United States where he earned a master's degree in criminal justice from the University of Cincinnati.

In 1980 Rajagopal became a deputy sheriff of Hamilton County.  He later became involved with Probation and in 2004 was serving as director of the Probation Department in Hamilton County.

Besides being an elector in 2000 and an alternate delegate to the 2004 Republican Convention, Rajagopal was president of the Hamilton County Republican Party for a time.

Sources
News India Times article on Rajagopal

American politicians of Indian descent
Indian emigrants to the United States
People from Hamilton County, Ohio
American deputy sheriffs
Ohio Republicans
Living people
2000 United States presidential electors
University of Madras alumni
University of Cincinnati alumni
Year of birth missing (living people)
Asian-American people in Ohio politics
Asian conservatism in the United States